Ingrata is a common species name.

Ingrata may also refer to:

 Ingrata, a 2001 album by Ram Herrera
 "Ingrata", a song by Mario Roberto Zuñiga
 "La Ingrata", a song by Café Tacuba